Lygus abroniae is a species in the family Miridae ("plant bugs"), in the order Hemiptera ("true bugs, cicadas, hoppers, aphids and allies").
It is found in North America.

References

Further reading
 Arnett, Ross H. (2000). American Insects: A Handbook of the Insects of America North of Mexico. CRC Press.
 Henry, Thomas J., and Richard C. Froeschner, eds. (1988). Catalog of the Heteroptera, or True Bugs, of Canada and the Continental United States, xix + 958.
 Schwartz, Michael D., and Robert G. Foottit (1998). "Revision of the Nearctic species of the genus Lygus Hahn, with a review of the Palaearctic species (Heteroptera: Miridae)". Memoirs on Entomology, International, vol. 10, vii + 428.
 Thomas J. Henry, Richard C. Froeschner. (1988). Catalog of the Heteroptera, True Bugs of Canada and the Continental United States. Brill Academic Publishers.

Lygus
Insects described in 1918